Brian Moore QPM (born 1959) was the first Director General of UK Border Force, he held the post between 1 March 2012 and 1 October 2012 in a temporary capacity, overseeing the London 2012 Olympics.

In July 2012, Moore announced that he would be standing down from the post in October 2012, choosing not to apply for the role permanently, to pursue "further options in his policing career". His leadership of the UK Border Force was controversial after reports of increased customer hospitality and uniform standards, while airport queues rose.

In May 2012, following an internal sexual harassment case involving one of Moore's senior officers, the coroner cleared Wiltshire Police of any wrongdoing, however it noted that the force was 'ill-prepared' to deal with such an internal matter and an independent inquiry found loopholes in vetting of the senior officer.

Early career
Brian Moore was Chief Constable of Wiltshire Constabulary from 1 January 2008 until 1 March 2012. During his leadership he made Wiltshire the safest county in the country.

Moore was previously the Deputy Chief Constable at Surrey Police, after working his way up the ranks since 1975 in Lancashire Constabulary, Metropolitan Police and Surrey Police.

Honours
While Chief Constable of Wiltshire, Moore was awarded the Queen's Police Medal in the New Year Honours of 2009.

References

External links
Wiltshire Police Website

1959 births
Living people
British Chief Constables
English recipients of the Queen's Police Medal
Date of birth missing (living people)
Place of birth missing (living people)
People from Wiltshire